Kemal Canbolat (born April 12, 1994) is a Syrian international basketball player.  He currently plays for Al Wahda Damascus of the Syrian Basketball League.

In 2020, he accepted Syrian citizenship. He has been a member of Syria national basketball team since 2020.

References

External links
 2023 WABA Qualifiers profile
 Proballers profile

1994 births
Living people
Centers (basketball)
Power forwards (basketball)
Sportspeople from Hatay
Turkish men's basketball players
Turkish people of Syrian descent
Syrian men's basketball players
Syrian people of Turkish descent
Al Wahda men's basketball players
Antalya Büyükşehir Belediyesi players
İstanbul Teknik Üniversitesi B.K. players
Torku Konyaspor B.K. players
OGM Ormanspor players